Allundy, New South Wales, located at 29°53′05″S 143°34′02″E, is a parish of Ularara County in north west New South Wales, Australia.

The main economic activity of the parish is agriculture.

The Salisbury Downs Station is to the west of Allundy.

The parish is on traditional lands of the Karenggapa people.

Climate 
The climate is semi-arid, featuring low rainfall, very hot summer temperatures and cool nights in winter. The parish has a Köppen climate classification of BWh (Hot desert). A minimum temperature of -3.9 °C was recorded in nearby Wanaaring in July 1997.

References

Parishes of Ularara County
Far West (New South Wales)